Kumaravayalur is a village in Tiruchirappalli district in the Indian state of Tamil Nadu. The place is located 9 kilometres from the heart of Tiruchirappalli  city and has the Subramanya Swamy temple.

It is 357 kilometres from state capital Chennai and the local languages is Tamil. The closest postal head office is Somarasampettai (2 kilometres away).  It is served by the Mekkudi and Muttarasanallur railway stations, with the closest major railway station 8 kilometres away at Tiruchchirapalli.

References

Villages in Tiruchirappalli district